Russia competed at the 2015 World Championships in Athletics in Beijing, China, from 22–30 August 2015.

Medalists

Results
(q – qualified, NM – no mark, SB – season best)

Men
Track and road events

 The race walker Aleksandr Yargunkin never made it to Beijing. According to reports in the Russian press his travel to the Championships was terminated because he had tested positive for EPO.

Field events

Combined events – Decathlon

Women 
Track and road events

Field events

Combined events – Heptathlon

References

Russian team

Russia
World Championships in Athletics
2015